Events in the year 2021 in Greenland.

Incumbents
 Monarch – Margrethe II
 High Commissioner – Mikaela Engell
 Premier – Kim Kielsen

Events

Ongoing — COVID-19 pandemic in Greenland

April
6 April – The 2021 Greenlandic general election is won by Inuit Ataqatigiit.

6 April – 2021 Greenlandic local elections. 
10 June – The Solar eclipse of June 10, 2021 is seen as an annular eclipse in parts of Russia, Canada and Greenland. 
28–29 August – 2021 Arctic X-Prix in Kangerlussuaq.

References

 
2020s in Greenland
Years of the 21st century in Greenland
Greenland
Greenland